Sugar Grove Station is a National Security Agency (NSA) communications site located near Sugar Grove in Pendleton County, West Virginia. According to a 2005 article in The New York Times, the site intercepts all international communications entering the Eastern United States. Activities at the site previously involved the Navy Information Operations Command (NAVIOCOM). In April 2013, the Chief of Naval Operations ordered that the NAVIOCOM support base be closed by September 30, 2015, as "a result of the determination by the resource sponsor National Security Agency to relocate the command's mission." The naval base is being repurposed as a privately owned healthcare facility for veterans, while the NSA listening station, to the south, continues to operate.

History
The station was built by the Naval Research Laboratory in the early 1960s for a  fully-steerable radio telescope intended to gather intelligence on Soviet radar and radio signals reflected from the moon and radioastronomical data from outer space, but the project was halted in 1962 before the telescope was completed. The site was then developed as a radio receiving station. Naval Radio Station Sugar Grove was activated on May 10, 1969, and two Wullenweber AN/FRD-10 Circulary Disposed Antenna Arrays (CDAAs) were completed on November 8, 1969. Numerous other antennas, dishes, domes, and other facilities were constructed in the following years. Some of the more significant radio telescopes on site are a  dish (oldest telescope on site), a  dish featuring a special waveguide receiver and a  dish (largest telescope on site).

The site was part of the ECHELON communications network operated by the United States and its allies to intercept and process electronic telecommunications. The network operates many sites around the world including Waihopai Valley in New Zealand, Menwith Hill in the United Kingdom and Yakima, Washington.

Sugar Grove is located in the National Radio Quiet Zone covering  in West Virginia and Virginia.

On July 26, 2016 it was reported that the online auction for Sugar Grove Naval Station concluded on July 25 with a winning bid of $11.2 Million.  The transaction later failed and bidding was reopened that September. In 2017, the second auction resulted in a $4 million purchase by an Alabama-based investment group with plans to convert the base into a healthcare facility for active-duty military, veterans, and their families.

Notes

References

External links

 Eyeballing Sugar Grove Echelon Station—Many maps, diagrams and large, high-quality satellite and aerial photographs of the site
 Sugar Grove History And Its Two CDAAs
 declassified Echelon file on Sugar Grove at the GWU's National Security Archive
 Satellite Photograph of Sugar Grove at Google Maps
 Navy Information Operations Command Sugar Grove Official Site

Further reading
 Bamford, James, The Puzzle Palace, Penguin Books, .
 Bamford, James, The New York Times, December 25, 2005: The Agency That Could Be Big Brother.

National Security Agency facilities
UKUSA listening stations
Earth stations in the United States
Communications and electronic installations of the United States Navy